Luigi Consonni (21 June 1905 – 1992) was an Italian cyclist. He competed in the time trial event at the 1932 Summer Olympics.

References

External links
 

1905 births
1992 deaths
Italian male cyclists
Olympic cyclists of Italy
Cyclists at the 1932 Summer Olympics
Cyclists from the Province of Monza e Brianza